Shinners is a surname. Notable people with the surname include:

Chris Shinners (born 1952), Australian rower
John Shinners (1947-2022), American football player
Kevin Shinners (born 1945), Australian rules footballer 
Lloyd Herbert Shinners (1918–1971), American botanist
Paul Shinners (born 1959), British footballer
Ralph Shinners (1895–1962), American baseball player